Marius Ludvig Lefèvre (4 May 1875 – 14 March 1958) was a Danish gymnast who competed in the 1912 Summer Olympics. He was part of the Danish team that won the silver medal in the gymnastics men's team, Swedish system event.

References

External links
profile

1875 births
1958 deaths
Danish male artistic gymnasts
Gymnasts at the 1912 Summer Olympics
Olympic gymnasts of Denmark
Medalists at the 1912 Summer Olympics
Olympic medalists in gymnastics
Olympic silver medalists for Denmark
Danish people of French descent